Loudon Township may refer to the following townships in the United States:

 Loudon Township, Fayette County, Illinois
 Loudon Township, Carroll County, Ohio
 Loudon Township, Seneca County, Ohio